Parc-y-Dwrlyn Ground is a cricket ground in Pentyrch, Glamorgan.  The first recorded match on the ground was in 1993, when Glamorgan played Northamptonshire in a List-A match in the 1993 AXA Equity and Law League.

In local domestic cricket, the ground is the home venue of Pentyrch Cricket Club who play in the South Wales Cricket League.

References

External links
Parc-y-Dwrlyn Ground on CricketArchive
Parc-y-Dwrlyn Ground on Cricinfo

Cricket grounds in Glamorgan
Sports venues in Cardiff
Sports venues completed in 1983
Glamorgan County Cricket Club